The 2018–19 ABA League First Division is the 18th season of the ABA League with 12 teams from Bosnia and Herzegovina, Croatia, Montenegro,  Slovenia and Serbia participating in it. It is the first time since the 2011–12 season that there are no participants from North Macedonia.

Format changes
On March 13, 2018, the Adriatic League Assembly decided to abolish the National standings and, as of the 2018–19 season, participants are determined only based on the results in the competitions under the umbrella of the Adriatic League (First Division and Second Division). Promotion and relegation will now be based on the First and Second Division.  The last place team in the First Division is relegated to the Second Division, while the winner of the Second Division is promoted.  Also, as of the 2018–19 season, the 11th placed team of the 2018–19 First Division season and the runners-up of the 2018–19 Second Division season will play in a Relegation Playoff for a spot in the 2019–20 First Division season. The format of the Qualifiers will be best of three, while the home court advantage will be given to the team that played in the First Division in the previous season.

The maximum number of clubs from one country in the First Division is five. The last placed club in the First Division will have a guaranteed place in the Second Division in the following season. The confirmed competition system shall not be changed until the end of the 2024–25 season, if there are no significant changes in the European basketball by then.

Teams

Promotion and relegation
A total of 12 teams will contest the league, including 11 sides from the 2017–18 season and one promoted from the 2017–18 Second Division.

Team promoted from Second Division
 Krka

Team relegated to Second Division
 MZT Skopje Aerodrom

Venues and locations

Personnel and sponsorship

Coaching changes

Regular season
The season began on September 28, 2018. The regular season ended on March 17, 2019.

League table

Positions by round

Results

Playoffs

The semi-finals will be played in a best-of-three format, while the Finals were played in a best-of-five format. Playoffs will begin on 23 March 2019 and planned to end by 22 April 2019.

Bracket

Semifinals

Finals

Relegation playoffs 
As of the 2018–19 season, the 11th placed team of the 2018–19 First Division season and the runners-up of the 2018–19 Second Division season will play in the Qualifiers for a spot in the 2019–20 First Division season.

As the team coming from the ABA League, Zadar had the home court advantage in the first and third game of the series, while MZT was the host of the second game of the Qualifiers series. Zadar won the series 2−1 and kept its First League status.

Teams 
 First Division 11th place:  Zadar
 Second Division 2nd place:  MZT Skopje Aerodrom

Results 

|}

Statistical leaders

| width=50% valign=top |

Points

|}

|}

| width=50% valign=top |

Assists

|}

|}
Source: ABA League

Awards

MVP List

MVP of the Round

Source: ABA League

MVP of the Month

Attendances
Attendances include playoff games:

Clubs in European competitions

See also 
 List of current ABA League First Division team rosters
 2018–19 ABA League Second Division
 2018 ABA League Supercup
 2018–19 Junior ABA League
 2018–19 WABA League

2018–19 domestic competitions
  2018–19 Basketball League of Serbia
  2018–19 Premijer liga
  2018–19 Slovenian Basketball League
  2018–19 Prva A liga
  2018–19 Basketball Championship of Bosnia and Herzegovina

Teams
 2018–19 KK Crvena zvezda season
 2018–19 KK Partizan season

References

External links 
 Official website
 ABA League at Eurobasket.com

 
2018-19

2018–19 in European basketball leagues
2018–19 in Serbian basketball
2018–19 in Slovenian basketball
2018–19 in Croatian basketball
2018–19 in Bosnia and Herzegovina basketball
2018–19 in Montenegrin basketball